Roy D. McLeod was an American football coach.  McLeod was the second head football coach at Dickinson State College—now known as Dickinson State University–in Dickinson, North Dakota and held that position for the 1927 season. His coaching record at Dickinson State was 1–0–1.

References

Year of birth missing
Year of death missing
Dickinson State Blue Hawks football coaches
Valley City State Vikings football coaches